Ataçınarı is a village in the Mazgirt District, Tunceli Province, Turkey. The village is populated by Kurds of the Alan, Hormek and Şêx Mehmedan tribes and had a population of 72 in 2021.

The hamlets of Dal, Dereyeziyaret, Evciler, Kamışlı, Kepir, Sevgili, Yaylacık and Yüceler are attached to the village.

References 

Villages in Mazgirt District
Kurdish settlements in Tunceli Province